Ashley Stoddart (born 10 June 1993) is an Australian competitive sailor.

She competed at the 2016 Summer Olympics in Rio de Janeiro, in the women's Laser Radial.

References

External links

1993 births
Living people
Australian female sailors (sport)
Olympic sailors of Australia
Sailors at the 2016 Summer Olympics – Laser Radial
21st-century Australian women